The Dumka–Bhagalpur line is an Indian railway line connecting  on the Jasidih–Dumka–Rampurhat line with  on the Sahibganj loop. This  track is under the jurisdiction of Malda Division of Eastern Railway.

History
The Bhagalpur-Mandar Hill branch line was constructed in 1893.
The construction of a new Dumka–Bhagalpur railway line was taken up as an associated project of Jasidih–Dumka–Rampurhat line to connect Dumka with Bhagalpur. The new railway line branches off from Dumka towards the north and connects with Bhagalpur railway junction. The 51 km railway line from Bhagalpur to Banka and Mandar Hill already existed. The railway was extended from Mandar Hill to Hansdiha was inaugurated on 22 December 2012. The 14 km line from Dumka to Barapalasi station was commissioned in February 2014. The remaining section from Barapalasi to Hansdiha was opened for passenger trains on 28 September 2016. This line will serves as second alternative option for railway traffic to Howrah and Bhagalpur and decreases distance between Bhagalpur and Howrah by nearly 70 kilometres.

Trains
Banka–Rajendra Nagar Terminal Intercity Express and Deoghar–Agartala Weekly Express run on Deoghar–Banka–Bhagalpur line. Godda–New Delhi Humsafar Express is the only premium train which runs on this route and Ranchi Godda Exp runs as a triweekly service on this route, connecting Santhal Parganas to the national capital and Jharkhand's capital.

Further extension
The -long Jasidih–Hansdiha–Pirpainti line is under construction. As of April 2021, work is under progress on Mohanpur–Hansdiha and Godda–Pirpainti sections. The  Hansdiha–Godda section was inaugurated on 8 April 2021 and a Humsafar Express runs weekly from Godda to New Delhi. This line is considered important to connect the Godda district in the Santhal Pargana division of Jharkhand with the rest of India. The  Godda–Pakur line is also planned

References

|

5 ft 6 in gauge railways in India
Rail transport in West Bengal
Rail transport in Jharkhand

Transport in Asansol
Transport in Jamshedpur
Transport in Kharagpur
Railway lines in Bihar